An epithelial sodium channel blocker is a sodium channel blocker that is selective for the epithelial sodium channel.

An example is amiloride, which is used in the treatment of hypertension.

References

Sodium channel blockers